Ritesh Pandey (born 14 May 1991) is an Indian playback singer, model and actor, who works in Bhojpuri cinema. He got fame after his  work in the films titled Balma Bihar Wala 2 (2016) and Tohre Me Basela Pran (2017). His song "Hello Kaun" had over 900 million views on YouTube and reached No. 1 on Global YouTube Music Videos Chart in 2020  becoming the most viewed Bhojpuri song ever.

Filmography
 India Vs Pakistan 
 Darar 2
 Yaara Teri Yaari 
 Kashi Vishwanath
 Parvarish 
 Rani weds Raja 
 Nache Naagin Gali Gali 
 Karam Yug 
 Tohre Me Basela Pran 
 Daag Ego Lanchan

Web series 

 Lanka Me Danka

Discography
 Hello Kaun

References

External links
 

1991 births
Living people
People from Sasaram
Male actors in Bhojpuri cinema
Bhojpuri playback singers